Habib Abdoe'r Rahman Alzahier (1832 – 1896), born in Hadhramaut, was an Arab who played a major role in the Aceh War.

References
1880. Korte levensschets van de Arabier Habib Abdoe'r Rahman Alzahir naar zijn eigen opgaven samengesteld. De Indische Gids II. Bladzijde 1008-1020.

1832 births
1896 deaths
Aceh War
Dutch East Indies
Hadhrami people
Hashemite people
History of Sumatra
Indonesian people of Yemeni descent
Year of death missing
People from Hadhramaut Governorate
19th-century Arabs